M&D's Scotland's Theme Park is an amusement park located in Motherwell, North Lanarkshire, Scotland. Bordering on Strathclyde Park, the park contains four operating rollercoasters, two water rides, several fairground rides, an arcade, a theatre, ten-pin bowling and an indoor tropical house, Amazonia.

In 2018, North Lanarkshire Council approved an expansion proposal from the park.

Attractions 
M&D's Theme Park has many rides and attractions, including four roller coasters, a log flume, several fairground-type rides, and many more rides designed for young children. Most were travelling rides owned by the park's operators, travelling showmen Matthew and Douglas Taylor.

Roller coasters 
 Runaway Mine Train: Prior to 2007, this roller coaster had spinning cars and a tire-propelled lift. These were replaced with a traditional fixed train and chain lift.
 Big Apple: A children's roller coaster.

Thrill rides 

 Wave Swinger: A 32-seat Swing ride.
 Captain's Curse: A Pirate Ship ride. It was absent from the park during the 2007–2008 season for refurbishment.
 Miami - Rip Tide: A Miami Trip. Replaced 'Fast & Furious'.

Water rides 

 Moby's Revenge: A three-lane dinghy water slide. The rightmost slide is a steep, straight chute, the middle slide is a shallower straight slide with dips, and the leftmost one is a spiral slide.
 White Water: A log flume, with two drops, of 23.0 feet and 39.4 feet. Souvenir photographs are also available to purchase at the end of the ride.

Junior Rides and Attractions 
 Trampolines: 10 trampoline beds. Roughly around 5 minutes per session
 Mini Dodgems
 Other smaller rides include "Taxis", "Sea Storm" and "Flying Jumbos"

Past rides
 Kamikaze: A Ranger. Closed in 2005.
 The Bomber Mark 2: A Fabbri Booster. Closed in 2014.
 The Giant Condor: The only one of its kind in Europe. Riders go up 30 meters in 28 2-seater gondolas. It debuted in the 2015 season as a replacement to The Bomber Mark 2.
 Space Coaster (formerly called Cobra and then Express): it  was sold after the 2015 season to Oakwood Theme Park.
 Tsunami:  Manufactured by Pinfari, was the only inverted roller coaster in Scotland. It closed due to an accident on 26 June 2016. Formally closed on 27 February 2017.
 Tornado: Was the park's largest roller coaster. Manufactured by Pinfari, with over 1km of track. The track contains two 360-degree vertical loops in addition to several banked turns, pulling −2Gs at some points. This ride has a top speed of over 80km/h. It formerly had a corkscrew which was removed after the 2005 season due to being exceptionally rough. It was sold in November 2020.
 Big Apple (1st): A children's roller coaster, which used to travel through a large fiber glass apple. It was removed in 2021 and relocated to Web Adventure Park.
 Mad Mouse: A Spinning Wild Mouse roller coaster. 2016-2021.
 Magic Carpet: Formerly known as "Ali Baba's Carpet" was a Magic Carpet ride, with a capacity of 40 people. The ride reaches a height of 14m and a top speed of 14rpm. It was replaced with a newer model in the 2017 season.
 Fast & Furious: A Miami Trip. It replaced the Magic Carpet at the start of the 2020/21 season.

Other attractions 
 Amazonia: The only indoor rainforest in the whole of Scotland, it contains exotic animals such as the poison dart frog, tarantula and python.
 Devil's Island: An 18-hole miniature golf course, played over water and in caves.
 Krazy Congo: Giant indoor soft play-area, for young children.
 Gamezone: Giant amusement arcade, containing over 150 different games, including the most recently developed games.
 Alona Hotel: The on-site hotel for visitors staying for a period of time. It contains a glasshouse restaurant and bar and an atrium for views overlooking the Strathclyde Loch.

Food and drink 

 The Family Restaurant: Formally Bizarre, is a family friendly restaurant with a bar.
 The Food Court: A 1960s styled diner serves American food and drink, and is decorated with Harley Davidsons and an authentic Italian carousel.
 Cosmic Bowl: Cosmic Bowl is Scotland's first glow in the dark bowling alley. It also contains a restaurant, the 'inside out' bar, and an arcade.
 Inside Out: A sports bar, showing a variety of sports on 6 LCD widescreens. The bar also has its own beer garden, which overlooks Strathclyde Loch.
 Diamond Lil's: An American Pool Bar, with 8 pool tables and 2 snooker tables.
 Bistro @ The Loch (formally Guiseppi's): The park's coffee shop and ice cream parlor. The bar looks out over Strathclyde Loch and serves a range of coffees, ice cream, milkshakes and sandwiches, made with traditional Italian ingredients.

Incidents and accidents 

In June 2009, six people were stranded on the park's Tornado roller coaster when high winds caused the safety systems to activate.

On the 4th of July 2011, nine people, ranging in age from 9 to 49, had to be rescued from the Tsunami roller coaster, after a mechanical failure on the ride left them stranded 60ft (18.2m) above the ground for up to eight hours.

In 2013 there was an incident on the White Water Log Flume where a teenage girl's leg was trapped between a barrier and a splash back on the ride's structure, causing a serious injury.

In August 2015, three people were injured when the White Water Log Flume slipped on its track, and later the same month a 58-year-old woman and three teenagers were forced to walk down from the top of the ride after it got stuck at the highest point.

In March 2016, eight people had to be rescued from the Tornado roller coaster after it became stuck 20ft (6.09m) above the ground.

On 26 June 2016, the roller coaster Tsunami derailed, injuring eight children and two adults. On the way down it hit the main structure and came to rest on the walkway.

References

External links

 Official Website
 Travel

Amusement parks in Scotland
Tourist attractions in North Lanarkshire
Buildings and structures in Motherwell
1996 establishments in Scotland
Amusement parks opened in 1996
2020 disestablishments in Scotland
Amusement parks closed in 2020